Carso Global Telecom is a telecommunications holding company, which  through its subsidiaries, provides various telecommunication services. Carso Global Telecom was spun off from Carlos Slim Helú's Grupo Carso conglomerate in 1996. Top Latin American mobile carrier América Móvil bought Carso Global Telecom for about $17.6 billion in mid-2010 as part of a larger $21 billion plan to consolidate Slim's telecom holdings in Latin America.

The Chief Executive Officer and President of the Board of Directors is Jaime Chico Pardo.

Companies
 Telmex
 Telnor
 Multimedia Corporativo, S.A. DE C.V.
 Global Telecom, LLC
 Empresas y Controles
 Technology and Internet, LLC 
 The Telvista company
 MTN
 Carso Telecom B.V.

References

Telecommunications companies of Mexico
Companies based in Mexico City
Telecommunications companies established in 1996
1996 establishments in Mexico
América Móvil
Mexican brands